The 2006–07 Cypriot Fourth Division was the 22nd season of the Cypriot fourth-level football league. Spartakos Kitiou won their 1st title.

Format
Fourteen teams participated in the 2006–07 Cypriot Fourth Division. All teams played against each other twice, once at their home and once away. The team with the most points at the end of the season crowned champions. The first three teams were promoted to the 2007–08 Cypriot Third Division and the last three teams were relegated to regional leagues.

Point system
Teams received three points for a win, one point for a draw and zero points for a loss.

Changes from previous season
Teams promoted to 2006–07 Cypriot Third Division
 Anagennisi Germasogeias
 Olympos Xylofagou
 FC Episkopi

Teams relegated from 2005–06 Cypriot Third Division
 Achyronas Liopetriou
 Enosis Kokkinotrimithia
 AEK Kythreas

Teams promoted from regional leagues
 AEK Kouklia
 AMEP Parekklisia1
 Thyella Dromolaxia

1AMEP Parekklisia (after their promotion) merged with ATE PEK Parekklisias to form Enosis Neon Parekklisia

Teams relegated to regional leagues
 Kissos Kissonerga
 Elia Lythrodonta
 Ellinismos Akakiou

League standings

Results

See also
 Cypriot Fourth Division
 2006–07 Cypriot First Division
 2006–07 Cypriot Cup

Sources

Cypriot Fourth Division seasons
Cyprus
2006–07 in Cypriot football